The 9th Secretariat of the Lao People's Revolutionary Party (LPRP), officially the Secretariat of the 9th National Congress of the Lao People's Revolutionary Party, was elected in 2011 by the 1st Plenary Session of the 9th Central Committee in 2011.

Members

References

Specific

Bibliography
Articles:
 

9th Secretariat of the Lao People's Revolutionary Party
2011 establishments in Laos
2016 disestablishments in Laos